Otto Günther (4 November 1822 in Leipzig – 1897) was a German lawyer and City Councilor.

He studied law and was awarded the Dr. iur. He then worked as a lawyer and legal director. From 1867 to 1872 he was a town councilor in Leipzig. From 1881 to 1897 he served as music director at the Leipzig Conservatory.

His brother is doctor and composer Hermann Günther, who wrote under the pseudonym the Komische Oper Herther The Abbot of St. Gallen.

19th-century German lawyers
1822 births
1897 deaths
Politicians from Leipzig